Shurrock is a surname. Notable people with the surname include:

Ann Shurrock (born 1946), New Zealand archer
Francis Shurrock (1887–1977), New Zealand sculptor and art teacher

See also
Sturrock